Donald R. Davis is an American astronomer specializing in the evolution of the Solar System.  With William K. Hartmann, he was responsible for proposing a theory in 1975 of the creation of earth's moon by a catastrophic collision. He is credited by the Minor Planet Center with the co-discovery of the trans-Neptunian object  in 1999.

In 2009, he was Academic Director at the Summer Science Program. A few months later, Davis arranged for the naming of an asteroid as 223877 Kutler, after Brendan Kutler—a student, whom he had worked with in that program—died in his sleep.

The main-belt asteroid 3638 Davis is named in his honor.

References 
 

American astronomers
Discoverers of minor planets
Living people
Summer Science Program
Year of birth missing (living people)